Eurylepis taeniolata, the ribbon-sided skink, alpine Punjab skink, or yellow-bellied mole skink, is a species of skink found in Central Asia, South Asia, and West Asia. It is the type species of the genus Eurylepis.

Description 
Diagnosis of the genus Eurylepis (Griffith et al. 2000): Elongate, 35 or more presacral vertebrae (convergent with many other scincid groups). Limbs relatively slender, lamellae not expanded. Head somewhat conical, dorsal surface convex in lateral view, parietal bone with clear lateral indentations and supratemporal fontanelle open. Sexual dimorphism in head proportions not distinct. Scales shiny, separated by shallow sutures. Two loreals, followed by two presuboculars. Post-nasal scales present. Palpebral scales and superciliaries not separated by groove. Four or five pairs of nuchal scales, followed by several pairs of broadened mid-dorsal scales and broad row of fused mid-dorsal scales. Large medial preanal scales overlie small lateral pair. Ear lobules conspicuous, but not covering ear opening. Color pattern consists of gray-brown background, with pale, broad dorsolateral stripes, more distinct anteriorly, brown rectangular spots dominating posteriorly.

Distribution 
Eurylepis taeniolata is found in Jordan, the Arabian Peninsula (NW/W Saudi Arabia, southern Yemen), Iraq, northeastern Iran, Afghanistan, Pakistan, western and northern India (Kashmir, Gujarat, Rajasthan, Punjab, Himachal Pradesh, Jammu and Kashmir), and southern Turkmenistan.

Subspecies
There are three subspecies:

References 

 Blyth, E. 1854 J. Asiat. Soc. Bengal  23: 470
 Griffith, H., A. Ngo & R. W. Murphy 2000 A cladistic evaluation of the cosmopolitan genus Eumeces Wiegmann (Reptilia, Squamata, Scincidae). Russ. J. Herpetol. 7 (1): 1-16
 Schmitz, Andreas; Patrick Mausfeld and Dirk Embert 2004 Molecular studies on the genus Eumeces Wiegmann, 1834: phylogenetic relationships and taxonomic implications. Hamadryad 28 (1-2): 73 - 89
 Shcherbak N N. 1990 Systematics and geographic variability of Eumeces taeniolatus Sauria Scincidae [In Russian]. Vestnik Zoologii.  1990. no. 3, pp. 33–40.
 Taylor, E. H. 1936 A taxonomic study of the cosmopolitan lizards of the genus Eumeces with an account of the distribution and relationship of its species. Univ. Kansas Sci. Bull. 23 (14): 1-643 [1935]

Eurylepis
Reptiles of the Arabian Peninsula
Reptiles of Central Asia
Reptiles of the Middle East
Reptiles of Afghanistan
Reptiles of Iran
Reptiles of Iraq
Reptiles of India
Reptiles of Pakistan
Reptiles described in 1854
Taxa named by Edward Blyth